was a merchant and purveyor to Japan's military during the Meiji Period. He established Kamaishi Mine Tanaka Ironworks (Kamaishi Kōzan Tanaka Seitetsusho) in 1887, which went on to become one of the leading steel manufacturers of the period.

A few years earlier, in 1874, Japan's Ministry of Industries (Kōbushō) had decided to build a modern furnace at Kamaishi . It appointed German engineers who went on to build a large-scale mill (with a railway system to carry the product and iron ore) utilizing two imported 25-ton furnaces. Local experts had advised a more modest method of learn-by-doing and gradual scale-up. The government, which never questioned the superiority of Western technology, overrode these objections and proceeded to construct the plant and operation started in 1890. However, within 196 days the plant had to be shut down and the government gave up- mainly due to the poor quality of coke made from Japanese coal.

Tanaka entered the steel business by taking over this loss-making government-run enterprise. He reverted to the earlier advise of building with smaller furnaces (5-6 ton), adapting the technology to local conditions, and then scaling up. Building on local knowledge, he adapted foreign technology through a process of trial and error – it took his people 22 months and 49 trial operations before they could finally produce iron. There was also help from Kageyoshi Noro.

By 1894, Tanaka was in a position not only to repair but also redesign British-made furnaces and succeeded in restarting them using coke as fuel.

References

People of Meiji-period Japan
Steel companies of Japan